Oreshkin (from орешек meaning nutlet, a small nut) is a Russian masculine surname, its feminine counterpart is Oreshkina. It may refer to
Aleksandr Oreshkin, Russian darts player
Dmitry Oreshkin (born 1953), Russian political scientist

See also
Orekhov (disambiguation)

Russian-language surnames